Cheryomushka is a rural locality (a settlement) in Pribaykalsky District, Republic of Buryatia, Russia. The population was 68 as of 2010. There is 1 street.

Geography 
Cheryomushka is located 79 km north of Turuntayevo (the district's administrative centre) by road. Kotokel is the nearest rural locality.

References 

Rural localities in Okinsky District